Gabriel Baralhas dos Santos (born 10 October 1998), known as Gabriel Baralhas, is a Brazilian footballer who plays as a central midfielder for Internacional.

Career statistics

Honours
Atlético Goianiense
 Campeonato Goiano: 2020, 2022

References

External links

1998 births
Living people
Footballers from São Paulo (state)
Brazilian footballers
Association football midfielders
Campeonato Brasileiro Série A players
Campeonato Brasileiro Série B players
Campeonato Brasileiro Série C players
Ituano FC players
Guarani de Palhoça players
Club Athletico Paranaense players
Red Bull Bragantino players
Atlético Clube Goianiense players
Sport Club Internacional players
People from Botucatu